There are three places named Westfield in the U.S. state of Wisconsin:

Westfield, Marquette County, Wisconsin
Westfield, Sauk County, Wisconsin
Westfield, Wisconsin village in Marquette County